The Indian Tomb (German: Das indische Grabmal; 1921) was a two-part German silent film directed by Joe May.

It is based on the 1918 novel Das indische Grabmal by Thea von Harbou. It comprised two parts, Part I: The Mission of the Yogi and Part II: The Tiger of Bengal.  Part I received its première in Berlin on 22 October 1921, and Part II on 17 November 1921.

Upon its release, it was neither a critical nor commercial success and has been little seen until two recent restorations were completed, a European film restoration and a U.S. video restoration by David Shepard.

Cast
Olaf Fønss – Herbert Rowland  
Mia May – Irene Amundsen, Rowland's fiancée 
Conrad Veidt – Ayan III, the Maharajah of Bengal 
Erna Morena – Princess Savitri 
Bernhard Goetzke – Ramigani 'Rami', the Yogi 
Lya De Putti – Mirrjha 
Paul Richter – MacAllan, an English officer 
Georg John – A penitent
Louis Brody – Black servant
Max Adalbert – (uncredited)

See also
 The Indian Tomb

References

External links
 
 

1921 films
1921 adventure films
German adventure films
Films of the Weimar Republic
German silent feature films
German black-and-white films
Films directed by Joe May
Films with screenplays by Thea von Harbou
Films based on fantasy novels
Films based on German novels
Films based on works by Thea von Harbou
Films set in India
Films produced by Joe May
Films produced by Erich Pommer
Films with screenplays by Fritz Lang
Films released in separate parts
Silent adventure films
1920s German films